James H. MacDonald (May 12, 1832 – January 19, 1889) was an American politician who served as the 24th lieutenant governor of Michigan from 1887 to 1889.

References

1832 births
1889 deaths
Lieutenant Governors of Michigan
Michigan Republicans
19th-century American politicians